The 2016–17 season was Klubi i Futbollit Tirana's 78th competitive season, 78th consecutive season in the Kategoria Superiore and 96th year in existence as a football club.

Season overview

June
On 1 June, Disciplinary Committee of AFA reduced the sentence of Gentian Muça from one year to only the first four matches of the new season. Eight days later, Elis Bakaj terminated his contract with the club and signed with the Croatian Prva HNL team RNK Split. On 13 June, Ilir Daja officially returned to Tirana after he was convinced by the club president Refik Halili, and during the press conference on the same day, they both presented the new project for the new season.

On 15 June, the club parted ways with Ilir Avdyli after only six months of cooperation. A day later, Tirana terminated the cooperation with the midfielder Allush Gavazaj, who spend the previous season on loan at Tërbuni Pukë. Tirana later brought back the veteran goalkeeper Ilion Lika for a third slint at the club.

On 23 June, Gentian Muça was sent on loan at Kukësi only for the club's 2016–17 UEFA Europa League campaign, just like in the previous season. A day later, Argjend Malaj signed with Skënderbeu Korçë as a free agent after he didn't extend his contract with Tirana.

On 29 June, Dritan Smajli left the club after terminating his contract after one season cooperation.

July
On 4 July, Ansi Nika was signed by the club on a free transfer; Nika signed a two-year contract. One day later, after one-year hiatus, Afrim Taku returned from the United States and signed a one-year contract with Tirana. They were presented on 8 July.

A day later, Tirana acquired the services of Marvin Turtulli from Dinamo Tirana on a three-year contract. Following that, on 11 July, Tirana purchased Asion Daja of Partizani Tirana on a two-year deal, becoming the club's fifth summer signing. On 13 July, Dorian Kërçiku agreed a contract extension with the club, singing until July 2019, while the goalie Edvan Bakaj signed a new two-year contract. One day later, Tirana signed a new two-year deal with Erion Hoxhallari. On the same day, the youngster David Domgjoni returned in the club after finishing his loan at Kastrioti Krujë and penned a three-year contract.

On 17 July, Tirana announced via its official Facebook page that the team traveled to Zlatibor, Serbia to make the summer preparations for the upcoming season. Tirana also informed that the team would stay for two weeks at Iris Hotel and will arrange four friendlies. One day later, Tirana brought on trial Nigerian striker Emeka Emerun, who flew out to Zlatibor to link up with the rest of the squad on their summer training camp. However, he left the team on 25 July after refusing to continue the trial.

Tirana won the first friendly match against OFK Petrovac with the result 3–1. Halili, Karabeci and Bajramaj scored the goals for Tirana. On 22 July, Gentian Muça returned to the team after the end Kukësi's European campaign. One the same day, Ryota Noma and Hiroaki Yamamoto joined the club on trial until the end of summer training camp. In the next friendly match against OFK Grbalj, Tirana suffered a 0–1 narrow defeat, with Todorović scoring the match only goal. In the third friendly versus Novi Pazar, Tirana didn't go more than a goalless draw. In the final friendly against the OFK Beograd, Tirana clinched a 1–0 victory to end thus the summer preparations.

August
On 19 August, Tirana confirmed the signing of four players, respectively Romuald Ntsitsigui, Ifeanyi Edeh, Moise Nkounkou and Merveille Ndockyt; they all signed two-year contracts and were presented on the same day. A day later, Tirana officially terminated the contract with the defender Ronald Gërçaliu by mutual consensus. On 26 August, Tirana completed the signing of the 19-years old striker Flamur Bajrami on a three-year contract.

September
Tirana started the month by completing the signing of Argjend Mustafa on a free transfer. Tirana started the season on 7 September with a goalless draw against Teuta Durrës in the opening 2016–17 Kategoria Superiore week. This draw was followed by another goalless draw away against Laçi four days later, a match which brought a controversial moment in the 38th minute as the referee Remzi Sadiku denied Tirana a clear penalty after a handball from a Laçi player. In the matchday 3 against Kukësi at home, Tirana produced a hard-fought performance, coming from behind two times to earn a 2–2 draw. Afrim Taku and Merveille Ndockyt scored the first goals of the season.

In the fourth match against Partizani Tirana in the so-called "Tirana derby", Tirana didn't go more than a goalless draw, making it the fourth consecutive draw. It was the worst start in the history of the club since the 1960'. To begin its Albanian Cup campaign, Tirana was shorted against Sopoti Librazhd and played its first leg match at Selman Stërmasi Stadium. Tirana netted first through a Gilman Lika goal in the 45th minute, but Sopoti equalized via a Mirel Çota penalty minutes before the final whistle.

Players

Squad information

Transfers

In

Summer

Winter

Out

Summer

Winter

Pre-season and friendlies

Competitions

Kategoria Superiore

League table

Results summary

Results by round

Matches

Albanian Cup

First round

Second round

Quarter-finals

Semi-finals

Final

Statistics

Squad stats
{|class="wikitable" style="text-align: center;"
|-
!
! style="width:70px;"|League
! style="width:70px;"|Cup
! style="width:70px;"|Total Stats
|-
|align=left|Games played       ||5||2||7
|-
|align=left|Games won          ||1||1||2
|-
|align=left|Games drawn        ||4||1||5
|-
|align=left|Games lost         ||0||0||0
|-
|align=left|Goals scored       ||5||8||13
|-
|align=left|Goals conceded     ||2||1||3
|-
|align=left|Goal difference    ||3||7||10
|-
|align=left|Clean sheets       ||4||1||5
|-

Top scorers

Last updated: 10 October 2016

Clean sheets
The list is sorted by shirt number when total appearances are equal.

References

External links
Official website

KF Tirana seasons
Tirana